Brotherhood Park is a former baseball ground located in Cleveland, Ohio. The ground was home to the Cleveland Infants of the Players' League in 1890. According to sources, it stood at Willson (or Wilson) Avenue (now East 55th Street) and the Nickel Plate Railroad tracks, which are now Metro tracks.

References

Defunct baseball venues in the United States
Sports venues in Cleveland
Players' League venues
Baseball venues in Ohio
Defunct sports venues in Ohio